Matthew Breetzke (born 3 November 1998) is a South African cricketer. He made his first-class debut for Eastern Province in the 2016–17 Sunfoil 3-Day Cup on 9 February 2017. He made his List A debut for Eastern Province in the 2016–17 CSA Provincial One-Day Challenge on 12 February 2017. He made his Twenty20 debut for Eastern Province in the 2017 Africa T20 Cup on 1 September 2017.

In December 2017, he was named in South Africa's squad for the 2018 Under-19 Cricket World Cup. In July 2018, he was named in the Cricket South Africa Emerging Squad. In September 2018, he was named in Eastern Province's squad for the 2018 Africa T20 Cup.

In September 2019, he was named in the squad for the Nelson Mandela Bay Giants team for the 2019 Mzansi Super League tournament. In April 2021, Breetzke was named in the South Africa Emerging Men's squad for their six-match tour of Namibia. Later the same month, he was named in Eastern Province's squad, ahead of the 2021–22 cricket season in South Africa.

References

External links
 

1998 births
Living people
South African cricketers
Eastern Province cricketers
Warriors cricketers
Nelson Mandela Bay Giants cricketers
Durban's Super Giants cricketers